Jody Stephens (born October 4, 1952) is an American  drummer, who has played in Big Star (with Alex Chilton of the Box Tops) and Golden Smog (with members of the Jayhawks and Wilco). After the deaths of Chris Bell in 1978, and both Alex Chilton and Andy Hummel in 2010, Stephens is the last surviving original member of Big Star.

Stephens also performs and records with Luther Russell as Those Pretty Wrongs. Their debut 7" was released in 2015 on Burger Records, and their debut LP released May 13, 2016 on the Ardent Music label. Stephens most recently contributed drums to "The Student Becomes the Teacher", a 2018 song by New York band The Lemon Twigs, who have cited Big Star as an influence.

Discography

With Big Star
Studio albums
 #1 Record (Ardent/Stax, 1972)
 Radio City (Ardent/Stax, 1974)
 Third/Sister Lovers (PVC, 1978)
 In Space (Rykodisc, 2005)

With Golden Smog
Studio albums
 Weird Tales (Rykodisc, 1998)
 Another Fine Day (Lost Highway, 2006)

With Those Pretty Wrongs
Studio albums
 Those Pretty Wrongs (Ardent, 2016)
 Zed for Zulu (Burger Records, 2019)

With The Lemon Twigs
Studio albums
 Go To School (4AD, 2018)

With The Reputations
Studio albums
 Electric Power (Nine Mile Records, 2018)

Notes

References 
 Jovanovic, Rob (2004). Big Star: The Story of Rock's Forgotten Band. London: Fourth Estate. .

External links
 Jody Stephens Interview NAMM Oral History Library (2017)

1952 births
Living people
American rock drummers
Big Star members
Musicians from Tennessee
Musicians from Memphis, Tennessee
Power pop musicians
20th-century American drummers
American male drummers
Golden Smog members